Swahn is a surname. Notable people with the surname include:

Alfred Swahn (1879–1931), Swedish sport shooter, son of Oscar
Oscar Swahn (1847–1927), Swedish sport shooter
Lennart Swahn (1927–2008), Swedish radio and television personality

See also
Swan (surname)